The 2002–03 snooker season was a series of snooker tournaments played between 27 August 2002 and 22 May 2003. Due to a legal ban, this was the final season to have events sponsored by tobacco companies (apart from Embassy, who would continue to sponsor the World Championship for another two years). The following table outlines the results for the ranking events and the invitational events. Mark Williams won all three triple crown events (UK Championship, Masters, World Championship) - the last player to do so in a single season.


Calendar

Official rankings 

The top 16 of the world rankings, these players automatically played in the final rounds of the world ranking events and were invited for the Masters.

Notes

References

External links

2002
Season 2003
Season 2002